Chevron nail (also known as a "Herringbone nail") is a rare transient fingernail ridge pattern seen in children, a ridge arising from the proximal nailfold and converging in a V-shaped pattern towards the midpoint distally. The nail growth pattern has no known association with medical problems and tends to resolve by early adulthood.

See also
Nail anatomy
List of cutaneous conditions

References

Conditions of the skin appendages